The latin competition in dancesport at the 2005 World Games took place on 16 July 2005 at the König Pilsener Arena in Oberhausen, Germany.

Competition format
A total of 25 were registered for the competition. Best ten pairs from round one qualifies directly to the semifinal. In redance additional four pairs qualifies to the semifinal. From semifinal the best six pairs qualifies to the final. Two pairs didn't enter the competition.

Results

References

External links
 Results on IWGA website

Dancesport at the 2005 World Games